The 1946 season was the Chicago Bears' 27th in the National Football League.  The team  improved on their 3–7 record from 1945 and finished with a  8–2–1 record, under head coach George Halas making his return from World War II en route to a Western Division title and an appearance in the NFL Championship Game. In the title game, the Bears defeated the New York Giants for their seventh league title and their fourth of the decade.

Schedule

Game summaries

Week 1

Playoffs

Standings

References 

Chicago Bears
Chicago Bears seasons
National Football League championship seasons
Chicago Bears